Andrea Klikovac (born 5 May 1991) is a Montenegrin handball player for CSM București and the Montenegrin national team. She is a defence specialist.

International honours
EHF Champions League:
Finalist: 2017, 2018
Third place: 2014, 2015, 2016

References

External links

1991 births
Living people
Montenegrin female handball players
Sportspeople from Podgorica
Montenegrin expatriate sportspeople in Hungary
Montenegrin expatriate sportspeople in North Macedonia
Montenegrin expatriate sportspeople in Romania
Expatriate handball players
Handball players at the 2016 Summer Olympics
Handball players at the 2020 Summer Olympics
Olympic handball players of Montenegro